The Galeón: Manila–Acapulco Galleon Museum or the Museo de Galleon is a maritime museum under construction within the SM Mall of Asia complex in Pasay, Metro Manila, Philippines. The museum will feature Manila–Acapulco galleon trade and will also house a full-scale replica of a Galleon within its interior.

Development

Conceptualization
Efforts to build a galleon museum dates back in 2010 when Foreign Affairs Secretary Alberto Romulo organized a diplomatic reception attended by ambassadors from 32 countries linked to the historical Galleon Trade. In the meeting such plans to build the museum were discussed.

Then-Philippine Senator Edgardo Angara went to Mexico City to meet with heads of relevant institutions to lobby for support for the project to build a galleon museum. Talks with the National Archives of Mexico, Colegio de Mexico, National Autonomous University of Mexico and Universidad Autónoma de San Luis Potosí to discuss on a research collaboration with Philippine universities and academics.

Mexican firms Grupo Carso of Carlos Slim Helú, FEMSA, and Cemex as well as Guerrero State government stated that they will back the galleon museum project. The plans to build a galleon museum were supported by Mexican politicians and figures such as Margarita Zavala, First Lady of then  President Felipe Calderón, Senators Teofilo Torres Corzo, and Humberto Mayans, as well as Mexican academics and publications also expressed support.

Philippine based-cultural agencies requested government seed funding from the Philippine government while a public fund raising was made. A presidential instruction by President Benigno Aquino III was made to provide financial support. However, this instruction was unsuccessful. Henry Sy, President of SM Prime Holdings, later offered to build the museum and donate a lot within the SM Mall of Asia complex.

The Museo de Galleon Foundation was created for the project. In mid-2015, Sy met with Mexican billionaire Carlos Slim in Mexico with the latter agreeing to donate artifacts to the SM Group for the museum.

Construction and delayed museum opening

Construction began in November 2014 and was initially planned for completion by late 2015. The museum was then planned to be opened in the 2nd quarter of 2016, but the opening date was moved at least three times to the 3rd quarter of the same year, to early 2017, and later to August 8, 2017. The latest given date was planned to be the soft opening of the museum. On that date, which coincides with the 50th anniversary of the foundation of the Association of Southeast Asian Nations, an "executive preview" of the museum was held, although the museum itself is yet to open.

An architectural firm based in Mexico along with architects based in Hong Kong and Florida, United States, were also involved in the project. The dome structure was built on a  lot provided by the SM Group.

COVID-19 vaccination hub
In April 2021, the Pasay City Government and SM Group announced plans to temporarily use the dome structure as a vaccination hub as a response against the COVID-19 pandemic. The vaccination hub, also known as the "Giga Vaccination Center," was opened on May 7. It is considered to be one of the country's largest vaccination centers, capable of vaccinating 2,000 people daily.

Museum layout
Visitors of the museum will be able to observe the construction of the replica which will take about 2 years to be completed. The museum will have three stories and will measure . The exhibit will have a linear presentation arranged in chronological order. Five permanent galleries and a temporary exhibition space will be housed by the museum. Among the exhibits to be housed in the museum are religious icons, navigation instruments and trade commodities originating from 42 countries involved in the galleon trade.

The Center for Pacific Trade and Cultural Studies, a research institute dedicated to the galleon trade, is also planned to be hosted inside the museum building.

See also
Mexico-Philippines relations

References

SM Mall of Asia
Museums in Pasay

History museums in the Philippines
Maritime museums